The 1976 Utah Utes football team was an American football team that represented the University of Utah as a member of the Western Athletic Conference (WAC) during the 1976 NCAA Division I football season. In their third and final season under head coach Tom Lovat, the Utes compiled an overall record of 3–8 with a mark of 3–3 against conference opponents, placing fourth in the WAC. Home games were played on campus at Robert Rice Stadium in Salt Lake City.

Schedule

Personnel

Season summary

BYU

References

Utah
Utah Utes football seasons
Utah Utes football